The Bullet Cluster (1E 0657-56) consists of two colliding clusters of galaxies. Strictly speaking, the name Bullet Cluster refers to the smaller subcluster, moving away from the larger one.

Gravitational lensing studies of the Bullet Cluster are claimed to provide the best evidence to date for the existence of dark matter.

Observations of other galaxy cluster collisions, such as MACS J0025.4-1222, similarly support the existence of dark matter.

Overview 
The major components of the cluster pair—stars, gas and the putative dark matter—behave differently during collision, allowing them to be studied separately. The stars of the galaxies, observable in visible light, were not greatly affected by the collision, and most passed right through, gravitationally slowed but not otherwise altered. The hot gas of the two colliding components, seen in X-rays, represents most of the baryonic, or "ordinary", matter in the cluster pair. The gases of the Intracluster medium interact electromagnetically, causing the gases of both clusters to slow much more than the stars. 

The third component, the dark matter, was detected indirectly by the gravitational lensing of background objects. In theories without dark matter, such as Modified Newtonian dynamics (MOND), the lensing would be expected to follow the baryonic matter; i.e. the X-ray gas. However, the lensing is strongest in two separated regions near (possibly coincident with) the visible galaxies. This provides support for the idea that most of the gravitation in the cluster pair is in the form of two regions of dark matter, which bypassed the gas regions during the collision. This accords with predictions of dark matter as only gravitationally interacting, other than weakly interacting.

The Bullet Cluster is one of the hottest-known clusters of galaxies. It provides an observable constraint for cosmological models, which may diverge at temperatures beyond their predicted critical cluster temperature. Observed from Earth, the subcluster passed through the cluster center 150 million years ago, creating a "bow-shaped shock wave located near the right side of the cluster" formed as "70 million kelvin gas in the sub-cluster plowed through 100 million kelvin gas in the main cluster at a speed of about nearly 10 million km/h (6 million miles per hour)". The bow shock radiation output is equivalent to the energy of 10 typical quasars.

Significance to dark matter 
The Bullet Cluster provides the best current evidence for the nature of dark matter and provides "evidence against some of the more popular versions of Modified Newtonian dynamics (MOND)" as applied to large galactic clusters. At a statistical significance of 8, it was found that the spatial offset of the center of the total mass from the center of the baryonic mass peaks cannot be explained with an alteration of the gravitational force law alone.

According to Greg Madejski:

According to Eric Hayashi:

A 2010 study claimed that the velocities of the collision as currently measured are "incompatible with the prediction of a LCDM model". However, subsequent work has found the collision to be consistent with LCDM simulations, with the previous discrepancy stemming from small simulations and the methodology of identifying pairs. Earlier work claiming the Bullet Cluster was inconsistent with standard cosmology was based on an erroneous estimate of the in-fall velocity based on the speed of the shock in the X-ray-emitting gas. Based on the analysis of the shock driven by the merger, it was recently argued that a lower merger velocity ~3,950 km/s is consistent with the Sunyaev–Zeldovich effect and X-ray data, provided that the equilibration of the electron and ion downstream temperatures is not instantaneous.

Alternative interpretations 
Mordehai Milgrom, the original proposer of Modified Newtonian dynamics, has posted an online rebuttal of claims that the Bullet Cluster proves the existence of dark matter. He contends that the observed characteristics of the Bullet Cluster could just as well be caused by undetected standard matter.

Another study in 2006 cautions against "simple interpretations of the analysis of weak lensing in the bullet cluster", leaving it open that even in the non-symmetrical case of the Bullet Cluster, MOND, or rather its relativistic version TeVeS (tensor–vector–scalar gravity), could account for the observed gravitational lensing.

See also
 Abell 520 – a similar galaxy cluster whose dark and luminous matter may have been separated during a major collision
 NGC 1052-DF2
 List of galaxy groups and clusters

References

Further reading

 
 
 
 
 
 CXO: Bedeviling Devil's Advocate Cosmology (The Chandra Chronicles) August 21, 2006
 CXO: 1E 0657-56: NASA Finds Direct Proof of Dark Matter Combined image of x-rays, visual and DM
 Harvard animation of the collision showing how the dark matter and normal matter become separated.
 Harvard Harvard Symposium: Markevitch PDF 36 color images and text slides modelling the existence of Dark Matter from Bullet cluster data
 NASA: NASA Finds Direct Proof of Dark Matter (NASA Press Release 06-096) Aug. 21, 2006
 Scientific American Scientific American article SCIENCE NEWS August 22, 2006 Colliding Clusters Shed Light on Dark Matter that includes a movie of a simulation of the collision

Carina (constellation)
Dark matter
Galaxy clusters